The Chambliss Astronomical Writing Award is awarded by the American Astronomical Society for astronomy writing for an academic audience, specifically textbooks at either the upper-division undergraduate level or the graduate level. Books suitable for this award must be currently available in North America. A single gold medal will be given, and if the winning book has multiple authors, the $1,000 monetary award will be divided, and multiple certificates will be issued.

References

See also
 List of astronomy awards

Astronomy prizes
American awards
Science communication awards
Science writing awards